The Peace Baptist Church is a church at 302 Sixth Street North in Birmingham, Alabama.  Its historic building was added to the National Register of Historic Places in 2005.  It was deemed significant for its association in 1963 with the Birmingham civil rights movement.  The historic building, which had become a fellowship hall for a new church building built in 1970, has since been demolished.

The historic building was a brick Gothic Revival structure with a gable front.  It had two short towers with pyramidal roofs.  By 2005, the building had become the J. H. Stenson Fellowship Hall.  It had been joined by the adjacent Sixth Street Peace Baptist Church, a one-story brick building.

References

Baptist churches in Alabama
Churches on the National Register of Historic Places in Alabama
National Register of Historic Places in Birmingham, Alabama
Gothic Revival church buildings in Alabama
Churches completed in 1963
Churches in Birmingham, Alabama